Devon Dwayne "Wayne" Chism (born June 16, 1987) is an American-Bahraini professional basketball player who last played for the Magnolia Hotshots of the Philippine Basketball Association (PBA). He played college basketball for the Tennessee Volunteers.

Career
Born in Jackson, Tennessee, Chism was the focus of the Volunteers' offense during his senior season.  He averaged 12.6 ppg, 7.2 rpg, and 1.3 bpg, all team highs. He also led UT to its first Elite Eight appearance in school history, where they were defeated by the Michigan State Spartans by a final score of 70–69.

Chism was not selected in the 2010 NBA Draft, but received summer league invitations from the New Jersey Nets and Sacramento Kings.

He played for Antalya BB in Turkey, but was released in December 2010. In January 2011, he signed to play with the Fort Wayne Mad Ants of the NBA D-League.

For the 2011–12 season he signed with Albacomp of Hungary.

In July 2012, he signed with  Aix Maurienne Savoie Basket of the French LNB Pro B for the 2012–13 season.

In October 2013, he returned to Hungary and signed with Kaposvári KK. In February 2014, he parted ways with Kaposvári.

In August 2014, he signed a one-year deal with Hapoel Gilboa Galil. On January 20, 2015, he was waived by the Israeli club.

In March 2014, Chism signed with the Rain or Shine Elasto Painters of the Philippine Basketball Association as the team's import for the 2014 PBA Commissioner's Cup.

In February 2015, he returned to Philippines for his second tour of duty as import for Rain or Shine Elasto Painters Chism led the Elasto Painters to a league-leading 8–3 win–loss record (a record they tied with Talk 'N Text) and to a finals stint before losing to Talk 'N Text in seven games. For his contributions to the team, Chism was awarded the Best Import of the Conference award at the end of the conference.

In November 2015, Chism signed to play and return to the Philippines for the third time, again playing for Rain or Shine as the team's import for the 2016 PBA Commissioner's Cup. However, on February 18, 2016, in a game against Meralco Bolts, he injured his hamstring, and was doubtful to play for the rest of the conference. Two days later, he was released by the team and was replaced by NBA veteran Antonie Wright.

In October 2016, Chism signed with Garzas de Plata Hidalgo of the Mexican LNBP.

In August 2017, Chism signed with Manama of the Bahraini Premier League.

Achievements
PBA Best Import of the Conference Award (2015 Commissioner's)

References

External links
Eurobasket.com profile
RealGM profile
Tennessee Volunteers bio

1987 births
Living people
African-American basketball players
Aix Maurienne Savoie Basket players
Alba Fehérvár players
American expatriate basketball people in Bahrain
American expatriate basketball people in France
American expatriate basketball people in Hungary
American expatriate basketball people in Israel
American expatriate basketball people in Lebanon
American expatriate basketball people in Mexico
American expatriate basketball people in the Philippines
American expatriate basketball people in Saudi Arabia
American expatriate basketball people in Turkey
Antalya Büyükşehir Belediyesi players
Basketball players from Tennessee
Fort Wayne Mad Ants players
Kaposvári KK players
Magnolia Hotshots players
NLEX Road Warriors players
People from Jackson, Tennessee
Philippine Basketball Association imports
Power forwards (basketball)
Rain or Shine Elasto Painters players
Tennessee Volunteers basketball players
American men's basketball players
Sagesse SC basketball players
21st-century African-American sportspeople
20th-century African-American people
Bahraini men's basketball players
Manama Club basketball players